is a former Japanese football player.

Career
After graduating from the Saitama Institute of Technology, Fukuda signed for FC Ryukyu in January 2017.

Club statistics
Updated to 22 August 2018.

Media
In 2018 he quit football to appear in the reality series Terrace House: Opening New Doors.

References

External links

Profile at J. League
Profile at FC Ryukyu

1994 births
Living people
Association football people from Kanagawa Prefecture
Japanese footballers
J3 League players
FC Ryukyu players
Association football goalkeepers